Pakistan Police Football Club is a Pakistani football club based in Quetta, Balochistan, Pakistan. Founded in 1962, it is one of the oldest Pakistani football clubs.

History 
Pakistan Police first participated in KDFA League in 1962. In 1984, the club entered in Interprovincial Championship, where they topped their group which included NWFP, Habib Bank and Pakistan Navy, they lost 4–0 to Balochistan in semi-finals. In 1985, they finished bottom of their group in Interprovincial Championship. In 1996, the club participated in the 1996 PFF President's Cup, they lost all their matches Quetta Metropolitan, Muslim Commercial Bank and Pakistan Railways. In 1998 PFF President's Cup, the club reached semi-finals, losing 1–0 to Karachi Port Trust. In 1999, the club entered National Championship, finishing bottom of their group. The same year, they participated in PFF President's Cup, where they reached quarter-finals, losing 1–0 to Pakistan Army. In 2000, the club reached quarter-finals of 2000 National Championship, they lost 3–1 to Pakistan Army. In 2001 season, the club reached their highest position in top-division, when they reached semi-finals of 2001 National Championship, losing 2–1 to Khan Research Laboratories. In 2019 PFF National Challenge Cup, the club reached quarter-finals after defeating Asia Ghee Mills 5–0 in their final group stage match. They got knocked out by Khan Research Laboratories with a 6–1 defeat.

Football Federation League

The club then entered the Football Federation League, they finished bottom of their group. In the 2010-11 Pakistan Football Federation League, Pakistan Police won by defeating Muslim F.C. in the finals. They earned promotion. At the end of 2011–12 Pakistan Premier League, they were relegated. In the 2020-21 Football Federation League, they topped the Group B table.

Pakistan Premier League promotion

In 2005, the club participated in 2005 National Football Challenge Cup, topping their preliminary group. In 2010–11 Pakistan Football Federation League, they won the tournament after defeating local rivals, Muslim 2–1 in the finals, earning promotion to 2011–12 Pakistan Premier League. The club stayed in the Pakistan Premier League for one season, as they got relegated at the end of 2011–12 season. The club failed to earn promotion in three back-to-back season, with their league appearance coming back in the 2014–15 Pakistan Football Federation League.

Honours
 Football Federation League: 2010–11

References 

Football clubs in Pakistan
Association football clubs established in 1962
1962 establishments in Pakistan
Police association football clubs in Pakistan
Football in Quetta